Liam McMillan (born 2 March 1990 in King's Lynn) is a British auto racing driver.

Racing career
McMillan first competed in saloon racing in 2006, competing in the 750 Motor Club's SAXMAX Championship. McMillan dominated the championship starting every one of the ten races from pole, recording eight fastest laps and scoring nine wins to win by over fifty points in the championship standings. The only blip in the win tally was at the penultimate round at Snetterton, when he finished in eighth position. In 2007 he stepped up to the SEAT Cupra Championship, driving in the New Leon Cupra Class. His best result of the year was a sixth place in the rain-shortened round eleven at Donington Park. and finished the season in twelfth place from a field of thirteen runners. He also entered three rounds of the Spanish SEAT Leon Supercopa, scoring a solitary point. For 2008 he competed a full season in the SEAT Leon Supercopa with the Triple R Team and ended the season tenth on points, including three podium finishes – all coming at the triple-header Circuit de Catalunya season finale. This was combined with four rounds entered in the inaugural SEAT León Eurocup, scoring four points and a best finish of sixth in the opening race at Circuit de Valencia.

In 2009 he competed in the British Touring Car Championship in a self prepared ex-works SEAT Toledo for his independent family-run Maxtreme Team, which was managed by his father Paul. However, the team never got its engine back after sending it for a refit, forcing them out of the series after just 3 rounds.

Racing record

Complete British Touring Car Championship results
(key) (Races in bold indicate pole position – 1 point awarded in first race) (Races in italics indicate fastest lap – 1 point awarded all races) (* signifies that driver lead race for at least one lap – 1 point awarded all races)

References

External links
Official Site.
BTCC Official Site.

Living people
English racing drivers
1990 births
British Touring Car Championship drivers
SEAT León Eurocup drivers
Sportspeople from King's Lynn
Ginetta Junior Championship drivers